John Lenaghan (1888 – 1951) was an English footballer who played for Stoke.

Career
Lenaghan was born in Liverpool and began his career with Welsh side Mardy before joining Stoke in 1910. He spent two seasons at the Victoria Ground scoring 10 goals in 37 appearances. He then returned to Welsh football with Chirk AAA.

Career statistics

References

1888 births
1954 deaths
Footballers from Liverpool
English footballers
Association football forwards
Mardy A.F.C. players
Stoke City F.C. players
Chirk AAA F.C. players